BIG FM is one of India’s largest radio networks that broadcasts primarily at 92.7 MHz. It is part of Reliance Broadcast Ltd. with 58 stations reaching about 1.9K towns and covering 1.2 lakh villages in the country. It is accessible to over 34 crore Indians across the country. With its distinctive and thought-provoking content, BIG FM is known for its timeless music and is a pioneer in storytelling with key properties such as Suhaana Safar with Annu Kapoor and Yaadon Ka Idiot Box with Neelesh Misra. In January 2019, BIG FM relaunched with a new philosophy and positioning statement - “Dhun Badal Ke Toh Dekho”. The biggest radio show - Dhun Badal Ke Toh Dekho Season 1 was launched with Vidya Balan as the host followed by a successful Season 2 with Sadhguru.

History

BIG FM first aired in September 2006 and since then it has curated remarkable content and has created some high impact communication campaigns that have been triggers of transformation. With its expansive reach, localised content and credible RJs the brand has played the role of a ‘thought inspirer’ and an agent of positive change in society. With this at its core, BIG FM refreshed its positioning in 2019 to take a second look at current situations and conversations by imbibing different perspectives in mind. This ideology is reflected across all the content, purpose-driven initiatives and client integrated campaigns. In 2020, BIG FM made its foray into the space of web radio with the launch of BIG Radio Online (BRO), with music and interactive shows targeting the youth of Hindi-speaking markets, taking a significant step in its journey of becoming a platform-agnostic audio entertainment entity.

Recent times

The radio network has already made significant inroads in digital audio storytelling with many key properties being made available in podcast format across various audio streaming platforms. It has further strengthened its partnerships with a dedicated focus on regional languages as well. BIG FM has long-lasting partnerships with Spotify, Gaana, JioSaavn.
 
They have successfully launched Big Living Shop - For the people who strive to live a sustainable life or who wish to but don't know where to start and how? The RJ's will curate sustainable and environmental friendly products from food to clothes to wellness, they have got it all covered for you. We all believe we can make simple tweaks to our consumption patterns with smart environment-friendly, locally crafted products, and solutions to live a more enriching life.⠀
To know more visit https://bigliving.shop/shop/

Blue Mic was launched in the month of October 2021 which is in association with Hungama Music, Hungama Play and Artist Aloud. The aim of this property is to give platform to Independent artists from all over the country. Every week a new artist is introduced and their songs are played from Monday to Friday from 4 PM - 5 PM. Also an Interview with performance is released on the YouTube channel of BIG FM every Saturday 6 PM.

Big Katha - Stories from the past, passed down generations, continue to fascinate one and all. What began as mere tales that engaged the listener from start to end has now found a deeper meaning as one today realizes the values that they imparted. With audiences now wanting riveting stories, filled with fun, mystery and adventures that intrigue them, BIG FM presents a new show – BIG Katha. The show will reimagine and retell these fascinating stories with a modern twist, at the same time retaining its core essence and morals. Hosted by popular RJ Khurafati Nitin and RJ Pihu, each episode of BIG Katha has the right ingredients of meaningful homage to the original stories coupled with new additions of rich themes, dark moods, fantasy and a dash of drama thrown in for good measure!

Key properties
 Blue Mic
 Big Living Shop
 Big Katha
 Suhaana Safar with Annu Kapoor
 Yaadon Ka Idiot Box with Neelesh Misra
 Dhun Badal Ke Toh Dekho Seasons 1 (with Vidya Balan) and 2 (with Sadhguru)
 21 Din Wellness In with Sunil Shetty
 Green Ganesha
 Kudiyan Di Lohri
 BIG Golden Voice

Top RJs
 Vrajesh Hirjee
 Annu Kapoor
 Neelesh Misra
 Bhawana Somaaya
 Kamini Khanna
 Richa Anirudh
 RJ Khaas Koushik
 RJ Pat Pat Pataki Shruti
 RJ Rapid Rashmi
 RJ Rani
 RJ Khurafati Nitin
 RJ Sangram
 RJ Abhilash

Areas of operation
 58 Stations

 24 States covered
 34 crore population covered
 19 languages

Awards
BIG FM's original content-based shows and engaging brand-led campaigns have consistently won accolades at prestigious industry awards like the Indian Radio Forum & New York Festival, EMVIES, ABBYs, Asian Customer Engagement Awards. 
To list a few - 
 10 Golds at IRF 2019
 8 Awards at IRF 2018
 9 Awards at ABBYs 2017 (in partnership with Mindshare and Maxus)
 6 Awards at NYF Radio Awards 2014

References

 Dhun Badal Ke Toh Dekho with Vidya Balan
 Dhun Badal Ke Toh Dekho Season 2 with Sadhguru
 21 Din Wellness In with Suniel Shetty
 BIG Golden Voice Season 7
 Green Ganesha
 Gulf Superfleet Suraksha Bandhan
 Treepublic 2.0
 IGiftEyesight
Radio stations in Kolkata

External links

 BIG FM India Official Site

Radio stations in Indore
Radio stations in Hyderabad
Radio stations in Bangalore
Radio stations in Bhopal
Telugu-language radio stations
Radio stations in Delhi
Radio stations in Haryana
Radio stations in Assam
2006 establishments in India
Radio stations in Vijayawada